Rudolf Ropek (born 4 October 1970 in Potštejn) is a Czech photographer and former orienteering competitor.

Orienteering
Ropek received a bronze medal in the relay at the 2001 World Orienteering Championships with the Czech team, and a silver medal in the sprint distance in 2003.

He received a silver medal in relay at the 2000 European Orienteering Championships in Truskavets.

Wander Book project

Ropek makes a living as a photographer and entrepreneur. In 2008, he founded the Wander Book (Wander Cards) project whose idea was to create easily storable collectible souvenirs and support tourism. Wander Cards are stickers with photos of tourist destinations or commemorating tourist and cultural events, which mainly cover the Czech Republic, its neighbouring countries (Slovakia, Poland, Austria, Germany) and Hungary.

See also
 Czech orienteers
 List of orienteers
 List of orienteering events

References

External links
 
 

1970 births
Living people
People from Rychnov nad Kněžnou District
Czech photographers
Czech orienteers
Male orienteers
Foot orienteers
World Orienteering Championships medalists